William Law (born 1882) was a professional footballer, born in Walsall. He played as an outside left for various English clubs, including in the Football League for Doncaster Rovers, West Bromwich Albion and Glossop, and the Southern League for Watford and Queens Park Rangers. Law played eleven first-team games for West Brom; the team did not lose any of them.

References

1882 births
Year of death missing
Sportspeople from Walsall
Southern Football League players
English Football League players
Walsall F.C. players
Scarborough F.C. players
Doncaster Rovers F.C. players
West Bromwich Albion F.C. players
Watford F.C. players
Queens Park Rangers F.C. players
Glossop North End A.F.C. players
English footballers
Association football forwards
Rushall Olympic F.C. players